Fludd may refer to:

People
Robert Fludd, 16th century mystic
Thomas Fludd, MP

Other
Fludd (band), a Canadian rock band prominent in the 1970s
Fludd (novel), a novel by Hilary Mantel
F.L.U.D.D., a water jet used as the protagonist's main weapon in the GameCube game Super Mario Sunshine

See also
Flood (disambiguation)